Sergei Prokofiev's Piano Sonata No. 2 in D Minor, Op. 14, is a sonata for solo piano, written in 1912. First published by P. Jurgenson in 1913, it was premiered on 5 February 1914 in Moscow with the composer performing. Prokofiev dedicated the work to his friend and fellow student at the St. Petersburg Conservatory, Maximilian Schmidthof, who committed suicide in 1913. Concert pianist Boris Berman has said of this sonata that it 'covers a huge emotional range: from Romantic lyricism to aggressive brutality'.

Movements 
Allegro, ma non troppo - Più mosso - Tempo primo (in D minor)
Scherzo. Allegro marcato (in A minor)
Andante (in G-sharp minor)
Vivace - Moderato - Vivace (in D minor)

References

Sources

Further reading

External links
Prokofiev's Sonata No. 2 on Classical Connect.
 

Compositions by Sergei Prokofiev
Piano sonatas by Sergei Prokofiev
20th-century classical music
1912 compositions
Compositions in D minor
Music with dedications
Piano compositions in the 20th century